Thomson Reuters Foundation News, formerly Alertnet, is a global news service, available free to smaller media outlets and non-government organisations around the world. It is run by the Thomson Reuters Foundation, the charitable arm of Thomson Reuters.

The global editorial team of over 45 journalists and 150 freelancers, covers the world’s under-reported stories at the heart of aid, development, women’s rights, human trafficking, property rights, climate change and resilience.

Awards

In 2017, Nita Bhalla won Journalist of the Year at the SOPA Awards.

In 2015, the team won the Asian Environmental Journalism Award for Excellence in Environmental Reporting by a Media Organisation, as well as a United Nations Correspondents Association UN Foundation prize 

In 2012, the Climate editorial team was selected as an Official Honouree of the 16th Annual Webby Awards in the Green category.

In 2011, the team was awarded the “Voices of Courage” Award by the Women’s Refugee Commission (WRC) 

In 2011, AlertNet was awarded an EPPY Award for the "Best News Website" category.

AlertNet received a gold trophy for “Best News Site” at the Lovie Awards.

In March 2011, the Foundation won the "Best Use of New Media" award for its Emergency Information Service (EIS) at the Third Annual Social Innovation Awards hosted by Justmeans.

In 2010, “Surviving the Tsunami: Stories of Hope”, a Thomson Reuters Foundation multimedia documentary created for the fifth anniversary of the Indian Ocean tsunami, was nominated for an Emmy award and won a prize at the Best of Photojournalism Awards. The documentary was also a finalist in the 2010 Dart Awards for Excellence in Coverage of Trauma and named Best Web Special Feature by Editor & Publisher.
AlertNet was named a Millennium Product by the British government, an award for outstanding application of innovative technology.[35]

See also 

 Index of journalism articles

References

News agencies based in the United Kingdom